Eric Rodriguez may refer to:
Erick Rodríguez (born 1991), Nicaraguan middle-distance runner
Eric Rodriguez (basketball) (born 1981), Filipino basketball player
Erick Mauricio Rodríguez (born 1968), Honduran lawyer and politician